The final of the Women's Long Jump event at the 2003 Pan American Games took place on Tuesday August 5, 2003. Canada's Alice Falaiye twice (third and fourth attempt) had a winning jump with a leap of 6.43 metres.

Medalists

Records

Results

See also
2003 World Championships in Athletics – Women's long jump
Athletics at the 2004 Summer Olympics – Women's long jump

Notes

References
Results

Long jump, Women
2003
2003 in women's athletics